Pieve Vergonte is a comune (municipality) in the Province of Verbano-Cusio-Ossola in the Piedmont region of Italy.

Geography

Pieve Vergonte lies in the valley of Ossola where the Anza river flows into the Toce. It is bordered, west to east, by the municipalities of Piedimulera, Vogogna, Premosello-Chiovenda, and Anzola d'Ossola.

20th century to today

Main sights 

 

 Church of Pieve Vergonte
 Workers' village, designed by architect Paolo Vietti-Violi from Vogogna, is, along with the one of Villadossola, among the model villages for northern workers built during the years of Benito Mussolini's government (1922–1943).
 Chemical factory, with offices designed by Vietti-Violi
The cinema, designed by Vietti-Violi
The mill for grinding gold ore, of which only the tub remains, at the Park of the Fallen of the Great War
Borgaccio Wall, near the river Toce, which demarcates Pieve Vergonte from the nearby village of Vogogna. It is the remains of a wall of the castle of Pietra Santa, which was destroyed on 9 February 1348, and it is commonly called the Borgaccio.

Economy

Industry 
The industrial chemical plant of Pieve Vergonte was founded in 1915 on the initiative of the Italian Society of Explosive Products (PETS) based in Milan, with 2,500,000 lire of capital. The first product for the military was iodine monochloride of chlorobenzene and phosgene, used during the First World War and later in the African campaign.

During World War II, chloralkali process, sulfuric acid, and fertilizers were produced. After the war, shutting down the production of sulphuric acid, and then the SIR Group, developed new product lines for the production of DDT and chloroaromatics. These products were used by the United States of America during the Vietnam War.

In 1981, the facilities of this company were transferred to the ENI Group and the ANIC Company. The ANIC, then EniChem, DDT plants ran until June 1996, and remained in production until their sale on 1 July 1997 to Tessenderlo, Italy. The chloralkali, chlorine and aromatic synthetic HCL are in production for the Tessenderlo Group.

In May 2013, Tessenderlo Group sold Tessenderlo Partecipazioni SpA, and its subsidiary Tessenderlo Italy Srl, to International Chemical Investors Group (ICIG). The transaction includes the plant in Pieve Vergonte (VB), where there now are an active electrolysis plant, one for chloro-aromatics, and two hydroelectric plants that provide energy.

Energy production 
The village of Pieve Vergonte produces electricity from hydroelectric power. The largest producer is the Edison Company with plants in Val Anzasca and Pieve Vergonte, both fed by the waters of the river Anza, with a total average production of 95 GWh. The second-largest producer is Tessenderlo's Battiggio plant, ex-Rumianca of Ceppo Morelli in Val Anzasca, on the Toce river at Megolo, which has a total average production of 90 GWh.

Natural resources and minerals 
Gold-bearing pyrites were mined in the Toppa Valley using mercury.

References

Sources 
 
 
 
 
 
 
 
 
 
 
 
 Memorie del Reale istituto lombardo di scienze, lettere ed arti, Volume 1,- Milano – Tipografia Bernardoni – 1843
 

Cities and towns in Piedmont